The 2020–21 FC Zürich season was the club's 125th season in existence and the fourth consecutive season in the top flight of Swiss football. In addition to the domestic league, Zürich participated in this season's edition of the Swiss Cup. The season covered the period from 11 August 2020 to 30 June 2021.

Players

First-team squad

Pre-season and friendlies

Competitions

Overview

Swiss Super League

League table

Results summary

Results by round

Matches

Swiss Cup

Statistics

Goalscorers

References

External links

FC Zürich seasons
Zürich